"It's in the Book" is a recorded comic monologue, partly sung, partly an exhortation in the manner of a revivalist preacher on the subject of Little Bo-Peep. It was marketed as a pop song and made the Billboard chart in 1952, reaching number one. It sold over one million copies, and was awarded a gold disc.

It was written by Johnny Standley and Art Thorsen (BMI Work #744156) and released by Standley on the Capitol label.

The recording can be heard in the background in the final scene of the 1971 film, The Last Picture Show.

See also
List of Billboard number-one singles of 1952

References

External links
http://www.angelfire.com/retro/crnr42/1952A.htm
http://turoks.net/Cabana/ItsInTheBook.php

1952 singles
Number-one singles in the United States